Parchment is a writing material made from specially prepared untanned skins of animals—primarily sheep, calves, and goats. It has been used as a writing medium for over two millennia. Vellum is a finer quality parchment made from the skins of young animals such as lambs and young calves.

It may be called animal membrane by libraries and museums that wish to avoid distinguishing between parchment and the more-restricted term vellum (see below).

Parchment and vellum 
Today the term parchment is often used in non-technical contexts to refer to any animal skin, particularly goat, sheep or cow, that has been scraped or dried under tension. The term originally referred only to the skin of sheep and, occasionally, goats.

Some authorities have sought to observe these distinctions strictly: for example, lexicographer Samuel Johnson in 1755, and master calligrapher Edward Johnston in 1906. However, when old books and documents are encountered it may be difficult, without scientific analysis, to determine the precise animal origin of a skin, either in terms of its species or in terms of the animal's age. In practice, therefore, there has long been considerable blurring of the boundaries between the different terms. In Shakespeare's Hamlet (written c. 1599–1602) the following exchange occurs:

Lee Ustick, writing in 1936, commented:

It is for these reasons that many modern conservators, librarians and archivists prefer to use either the broader term parchment, or the neutral term animal membrane.

History 

The history of parchment is inseparable from the written word, once it had descended from clay tablets. A subsidiary use was found by scientists, most notably Thomas Graham, who employed parchment for the separation of aqueous solutions he termed dialysis; in this respect, parchment is seen to be akin to sausage casings made from the intestines.

The word parchment evolved (via the Latin  and the French ) from the name of the city of Pergamon, which was a thriving center of parchment production during the Hellenistic period. The city so dominated the trade that a legend later arose which said that parchment had been invented in Pergamon to replace the use of papyrus which had become monopolized by the rival city of Alexandria. This account, originating in the writings of Pliny the Elder (Natural History, Book XII, 69–70), is false because parchment had been in use in Anatolia and elsewhere long before the rise of Pergamon.

Herodotus mentions writing on skins as common in his time, the 5th century BC; and in his Histories (v.58) he states that the Ionians of Asia Minor had been accustomed to give the name of skins to books; this word was adapted by Hellenized Jews to describe scrolls. In the 2nd century BC, a great library was set up in Pergamon that rivalled the famous Library of Alexandria. As prices rose for papyrus and the reed used for making it was over-harvested towards local extinction in the two nomes of the Nile delta that produced it, Pergamon adapted by increasing the use of parchment.

Writing on prepared animal skins had a long history, however. David Diringer noted that "the first mention of Egyptian documents written on leather goes back to the Fourth Dynasty (c. 2550–2450 BC), but the earliest of such documents extant are: a fragmentary roll of leather of the Sixth Dynasty (c. 24th century BC), unrolled by Dr. H. Ibscher, and preserved in the Cairo Museum; a roll of the Twelfth Dynasty (c. 1990–1777 BC) now in Berlin; the mathematical text now in the British Museum (MS. 10250); and a document of the reign of Ramses II (early thirteenth century BC)." Though the Assyrians and the Babylonians impressed their cuneiform on clay tablets, they also wrote on parchment from the 6th century BC onward. Rabbinic literature traditionally maintains that the institution of employing parchment made of animal hides for the writing of ritual objects such as the Torah, mezuzah, and tefillin is Sinaitic in origin, with special designations for different types of parchment such as gevil and klaf.

Early Islamic texts are also found on parchment.

In the later Middle Ages, especially the 15th century, parchment was largely replaced by paper for most uses except luxury manuscripts, some of which were also on paper. New techniques in paper milling allowed it to be much cheaper than parchment; it was made of textile rags and of very high quality. With the advent of printing in the later fifteenth century, the demands of printers far exceeded the supply of animal skins for parchment.

There was a short period during the introduction of printing where parchment and paper were used at the same time, with parchment (in fact vellum) the more expensive luxury option, preferred by rich and conservative customers. Although most copies of the Gutenberg Bible are on paper, some were printed on parchment; 12 of the 48 surviving copies, with most incomplete. In 1490, Johannes Trithemius preferred the older methods, because "handwriting placed on parchment will be able to endure a thousand years. But how long will printing last, which is dependent on paper? For if ... it lasts for two hundred years that is a long time." In fact, high-quality paper from this period has survived 500 years or more very well, if kept in reasonable library conditions.

The heyday of parchment use was during the medieval period, but there has been a growing revival of its use among artists since the late 20th century. Although parchment never stopped being used (primarily for governmental documents and diplomas) it had ceased to be a primary choice for artists' supports by the end of the 15th century Renaissance. This was partly due to its expense and partly due to its unusual working properties. Parchment consists mostly of collagen. When the water in paint media touches the parchment's surface, the collagen melts slightly, forming a raised bed for the paint, a quality highly prized by some artists.

Parchment is also extremely affected by its environment and changes in humidity, which can cause buckling. Books with parchment pages were bound with strong wooden boards and clamped tightly shut by metal (often brass) clasps or leather straps; this acted to keep the pages pressed flat despite humidity changes. Such metal fittings continued to be found on books as decorative features even after the use of paper made them unnecessary.

Some contemporary artists prize the changeability of parchment, noting that the material seems alive and like an active participant in making artwork. To support the needs of the revival of use by artists, a revival in the art of preparing individual skins is also underway. Hand-prepared skins are usually preferred by artists because they are more uniform in surface and have fewer oily spots – which can cause long-term cracking of paint – than mass-produced parchment, which is usually made for lamp shades, furniture, or other interior design purposes.

The radiocarbon dating techniques that are used on papyrus can be applied to parchment as well. They do not date the age of the writing but the preparation of the parchment itself. While it is feasibly possible also to radiocarbon date certain kinds of ink, it is extremely difficult to do due to the fact that they are generally present on the text only in trace amounts, and it is hard to get a carbon sample of them without the carbon in the parchment contaminating it.

Manufacture 
Parchment is prepared from pelt – i.e. wet, unhaired, and limed skin – by drying at ordinary temperatures under tension, most commonly on a wooden frame known as a stretching frame.

Skinning, soaking, and dehairing
After a carcass is skinned, the hide is soaked in water for about a day. This removes blood and grime and prepares the skin for a dehairing liquor. The dehairing liquor was originally made of rotted, or fermented, vegetable matter, like beer or other liquors, but by the Middle Ages a dehairing bath included lime. Today, the lime solution is occasionally sharpened by the use of sodium sulfide. The liquor bath would have been in wooden or stone vats and the hides stirred with a long wooden pole to avoid human contact with the alkaline solution. Sometimes the skins would stay in the dehairing bath for eight or more days depending how concentrated and how warm the solution was kept – dehairing could take up to twice as long in winter. The vat was stirred two or three times a day to ensure the solution's deep and uniform penetration. Replacing the lime water bath also sped the process up. However, if the skins were soaked in the liquor too long, they would be weakened and not able to stand the stretching required for parchment.

Stretching 
After soaking in water to make the skins workable, the skins were placed on a stretching frame. A simple frame with nails would work well in stretching the pelts. The skins could be attached by wrapping small, smooth rocks in the skins with rope or leather strips. Both sides would be left open to the air so they could be scraped with a sharp, semi-lunar knife to remove the last of the hair and get the skin to the right thickness. The skins, which were made almost entirely of collagen, would form a natural glue while drying and once taken off the frame they would keep their form. The stretching aligned the fibres to be more nearly parallel to the surface.

Treatments 

To make the parchment more aesthetically pleasing or more suitable for the scribes, special treatments were used. According to Reed there were a variety of these treatments. Rubbing pumice powder into the flesh side of parchment while it was still wet on the frame was used to make it smooth and to modify the surface to enable inks to penetrate more deeply. Powders and pastes of calcium compounds were also used to help remove grease so the ink would not run. To make the parchment smooth and white, thin pastes (starchgrain or staunchgrain) of lime, flour, egg whites and milk were rubbed into the skins.

Meliora di Curci in her paper, "The History and Technology of Parchment Making", notes that parchment was not always white. "Cennini, a 15th-century craftsman provides recipes to tint parchment a variety of colours including purple, indigo, green, red and peach." The Early medieval Codex Argenteus and Codex Vercellensis, the Stockholm Codex Aureus and the Codex Brixianus give a range of luxuriously produced manuscripts all on purple vellum, in imitation of Byzantine examples, like the Rossano Gospels, Sinope Gospels and the Vienna Genesis, which at least at one time are believed to have been reserved for Imperial commissions.

Many techniques for parchment repair exist, to restore creased, torn, or incomplete parchments.

Reuse 

Between the seventh and the ninth centuries, many earlier parchment manuscripts were scrubbed and scoured to be ready for rewriting, and often the earlier writing can still be read. These recycled parchments are known as palimpsests. Later, more thorough techniques of scouring the surface irretrievably lost the earlier text.

Jewish parchment 

The way in which parchment was processed (from hide to parchment) has undergone a tremendous evolution based on time and location. Parchment and vellum are not the sole methods of preparing animal skins for writing. In the Babylonian Talmud (Bava Batra 14B), Moses is described as having written the first Torah Scroll on the unsplit cow-hide called gevil.

Parchment is still the only medium used by traditional religious Jews for Torah scrolls or tefilin and mezuzahs, and is produced by large companies in Israel. For those uses, only hides of kosher animals are permitted. Since there are many requirements for it being fit for the religious use, the liming is usually processed under supervision of a qualified Rabbi.

Additional uses of the term 
In some universities, the word parchment is still used to refer to the certificate (scroll) presented at graduation ceremonies, even though the modern document is printed on paper or thin card; although doctoral graduates may be given the option of having their scroll written by a calligrapher on vellum. Heriot-Watt University still uses goatskin parchment for their degrees.

Plant-based parchment 

Vegetable (paper) parchment is made by passing a waterleaf (an unsized paper like blotters) made of pulp fibers into sulfuric acid. The sulfuric acid hydrolyses and solubilises the main natural organic polymer, cellulose, present in the pulp wood fibers. The paper web is then washed in water, which stops the hydrolysis of the cellulose and causes a kind of cellulose coating to form on the waterleaf. The final paper is dried. This coating is a natural non-porous cement, that gives to the vegetable parchment paper its resistance to grease and its semi-translucency.

Other processes can be used to obtain grease-resistant paper, such as waxing the paper or using fluorine-based chemicals. Highly beating the fibers gives an even more translucent paper with the same grease resistance. Silicone and other coatings may also be applied to the parchment. A silicone-coating treatment produces a cross-linked material with high density, stability and heat resistance and low surface tension which imparts good anti-stick or release properties. Chromium salts can also be used to impart moderate anti-stick properties.

Parchment craft 

Historians believe that parchment craft originated as an art form in Europe during the fifteenth or sixteenth centuries. Parchment craft at that time occurred principally in Catholic communities, where crafts persons created lace-like items such as devotional pictures and communion cards. The craft developed over time, with new techniques and refinements being added. Until the sixteenth century, parchment craft was a European art form. However, missionaries and other settlers relocated to South America, taking parchment craft with them. As before, the craft appeared largely among the Catholic communities. Often, young girls receiving their first communion received gifts of handmade parchment crafts.

Although the invention of the printing press led to a reduced interest in hand made cards and items, by the eighteenth century, people were regaining interest in detailed handwork. Parchment cards became larger in size and crafters began adding wavy borders and perforations. In the nineteenth century, influenced by French romanticism, parchment crafters began adding floral themes and cherubs and hand embossing.

Parchment craft today involves various techniques, including tracing a pattern with white or colored ink, embossing to create a raised effect, stippling, perforating, coloring and cutting. Parchment craft appears in hand made cards, as scrapbook embellishments, as bookmarks, lampshades, decorative small boxes, wall hangings and more.

DNA testing 
An article published in 2009 by Timothy L. Stinson considered the possibilities of tracing the origin of medieval parchment manuscripts and codices through DNA analysis. The methodology would employ polymerase chain reaction to replicate a small DNA sample to a size sufficiently large for testing. Stinson's article discusses the use of DNA testing to estimate the age of the calf at the creation of the vellum parchment. A 2006 study revealed the genetic signature of several Greek manuscripts to have "goat-related sequences". Utilizing these techniques we may be able to determine whether related library materials were made from genetically related animals (perhaps from the same herd) and locate the vellum's origination.

In 2020, it was reported that the species of several of the animals used to provide parchment for the Dead Sea Scrolls could be identified, and the relationship between skins obtained from the same animal inferred. The breakthrough was made possible by the use of whole genome sequencing.

See also 
 Bating (leather)
 Conservation and restoration of parchment
 Manuscript culture

References

Notes

Bibliography

Further reading

External links 

 
 Preservation of 18th Century Parchment | "From the Stacks" at New-York Historical Society
 On-line demonstration of the preparation of vellum , Bibliothèque nationale de France – Text in French, but mostly visual

Leather goods
Book design
Writing media
Textual scholarship
Leathermaking